Chaudhry Abdul Hameed Khan  E. A. C.

Chaudhary Abdul Hameed Khan (1906 – 1958) (Urdu:   چوہدری عبدالحمید خان  ) was in British Indian civil service

Early life
Ch Abdul Hameed Khan was born in Jullundur in 1906. His father belonged to the family of Ghorewaha Rajput at Rahon in the Jullundur District. His lineage finds a place in the Official Jullundur District Gazetteer which shows they were rulers of Jullundur. Got his early education from Jullundur. He did his master's degree in English and LLM from Aligarh Muslim University in 1926.

Family
Abdul Hameed had three brothers
 Rai Muhammad Ali he got the title of Rai from British government as he played a key Role in Rahon Jagir (estate).
 Chaudhry M Sadeeq he joined Government Service as Tehsildar of Ludhiana.
 Chaudhry M Latif he was Lambardar of Rahon.
His cousin  Chaudhry M Sharif served as Tehsil President Rahon (1945 to 1947). Abdul Hameed was son in law of Rana of Rahon. His family controlled most of the area's.

Another family member was Chaudhry M Ishaq he received Afghan War Medal 1919. He was taken in as assistant commissioner in 1929. His father Chaudhry Ghulam Murtaza was lambardar of udhowal.

After partition Abdul hameed son Chaudhry Abdul Waheed served as District Chairman Sheikhpura.
 Chaudhry Abdul Qadir (son)
 Chaudhry Moin ud Din Ahmad (son).

Civil Service
He joined Punjab civil secretariat by the order of then Governor of Punjab Geoffrey Fitzhervey de Montmorency. He was appointed as Assistant Commissioner. He was ADM Muzaffargarh Ferozepur Montgomery and Karnal. He served as Deputy commissioner Sargodha and Jhang later becoming Rehabilitation Commissioner of West Pakistan and then appointed as Home Secretary West Pakistan. He was an important Bureaucrat and Statesman as mentioned by Qudrat Ullah Shahab in Shahab Nama. He died while in service in 1958.

References
 http://dl.nlb.gov.bd/greenstone/collect/admin-books/index/assoc/HASH01d1/1c15a774.dir/GAZETTEER%20OF%20THE%20JULLUNDUR%20DISTRICT%252CPART-A-1904%20-180%20-%20page%201.pdf
 Illustrated Encyclopaedia & Who's who of Princely States in Indian Sub-continent

1906 births
1958 deaths
Aligarh Muslim University alumni
Indian Civil Service (British India) officers
People from Jalandhar